Brookman Point is the snow-covered northwest point of Grant Island, lying off the coast of Marie Byrd Land and Getz Ice Shelf. It was discovered and first charted from the USS Glacier (Captain Edwin A. McDonald, USN) in February 1962, and named by the Advisory Committee on Antarctic Names for Lieutenant Peter J. Brookman, Civil Engineer Corps, U.S. Navy, Officer-in-Charge at Byrd Station, 1970.

References
 

Headlands of Marie Byrd Land